Meerut (IAST: Meraṭh) is a city in Meerut district of the western part of the Indian state of Uttar Pradesh.

, Meerut is the 33rd most populous urban agglomeration and the 26th most populous city in India. It ranked 292nd in 2006 and is projected to rank 242nd in 2020 in the list of largest cities and urban areas in the world. The city is one of the largest producers of sports goods, and the largest producer of musical instruments in India. The city is also an education hub in western Uttar Pradesh, and is also known as the "Sports City Of India". The city is famous for being the starting point of the 1857 rebellion against Company rule in India.

Origin of the name
The city may have derived its name from 'Mayarashtra' (Sanskrit: मयराष्ट्र), the capital of the kingdom of Mayasura, Mandodari's father and Ravana's father-in-law. This name may have mutated to Mairashtra, Mai-dant-ka-khera, Mairaath and eventually Meerut.

According to another version, Maya(sura), being a distinguished architect, received from King Yudhishthira the land on which the city of Meerut now stands and he called this place Maharashtra, a name which in the course of time became shortened to Meerut. Tradition also has it that the city formed a part of the dominions of Mahipala, the king of Indraprastha, and the word Meerut is associated with his name.

The meaning of मय is alcohol. It is a production centre of alcohol with factories (sugar Mills) producing alcohol, hence the name मय is added from a alcohol production city. (Mawana Sugar Distillary). Maykhana is also a word which means Bar in Hindi. All alcohol was sent to capital Delhi and exported all over India. In India, cities are named on their popular produce. Hence Meerut as a production house of alcohol (मय) is called Meerut.

History

Ancient era
In Ramayana, It was known as 'Maydant Ka Kheda', the capital of May Danav. It was hometown of Mandodari, wife of Ravana.

Meerut also contained a Harappan settlement known as Alamgirpur. It was also the easternmost settlement of the Indus Valley civilisation. Meerut had been a centre of Buddhism in the period of Mauryan Emperor Ashoka (r. 273 BC to 232 BC.), and remains of Buddhist structures were found near the Jama Masjid in the present day city. The Ashoka Pillar, at Delhi ridge, next to the ‘Bara Hindu Rao Hospital’, near Delhi University, was carried to Delhi from Meerut, by Firuz Shah Tughluq (r. 1351–1388); it was later damaged in a 1713 explosion, and restored in 1867.

Muslim conquests
In the eleventh century AD, the region to the south-west of the city was ruled by Har Dat, the Dor  Raja of Bulandshahr who built a fort, which was long known for its strength and finds mention in Ain-i-Akbari. He was later defeated by Mahmud of Ghazni in 1018, surrendering along with his forces to Mahmud. The prominent local landmark known as the Jama Masjid, dates from this period and is said to have been built by Mahmud's vizir. Shortly after its capture the city was regained by the local Hindu Raja and part of his fortifications, built for the city's defence, survived until recent times. Muhammad of Ghor's mamluk general Qutb-ud-din Aybak who went on to establish the Delhi Sultanate in 1206, attacked and captured Meerut in 1193.

Timur in 1399 attacked and sacked Meerut. It was held by Ilyas Afghan and his son Maula Muhammad Thaneswari who was assisted by non-Muslims led by Safi. Timur tried to negotiate a surrender, to which the inhabitants of the fort replied by stating that Tarmashirin had tried to capture it in the past but failed. Incensed, he set forth with 10,000 cavalry. The forces scaled the walls and Safi was killed in the battle. The inhabitants were killed and their wives and children enslaved. The fortifications and houses were razed to the ground with prisoners ordered to be flayed alive.

The city then came under the rule of the Mughal Empire and saw a period of relative tranquility. During the rule of Mughal Emperor, Akbar the Great (r. 1556–1605), there was a mint for copper coins here. Also occurring during the reign of Akbar, Meerut was listed in the Ain-i-Akbari as a pargana under Delhi sarkar, producing a revenue of 4,391,996 dams for the imperial treasury and supplying a force of 300 infantry and 100 cavalry.
Major part of the Meerut was in the control of Sayyid Jagirdars of Abdullapur Meerut from 16th to late 18th century, Sayyed Mir Abdulla Naqvi Al Bukhari built Kot Fort in Abdullapur in 16th century, this place was his main residence. The descendants of Syed Sadarudin Shah Kabir Naqvi Al Kannauji Bukhari still present in this town, Sadarudin was a chief advisor of Sikandar Lodi and the father of great saint Shah Jewna. Famous Pakistani writer Syed Qudrat Naqvi Al Bukhari was born in Meerut.

Nawab Mansab Ali Khan was one of the most influential personality of this city, he built famous Karbala and Masjid known as  Mansabiya in 1882.

The city saw Sikh and Maratha invasions in the 18th century, with interruptions by Jats and Rohillas. Walter Reinhardt, an English soldier, established himself at Sardhana and some parts of the district came under his rule. Upon his death, they came into the hands of Begum Samru. During this time, the southern part of the district had remained under Marathas rule.

Colonial era
In 1803, with the fall of Delhi, Daulat Rao Scindia of the Marathas ceded the territory to the British East India Company (EIC). The cantonment of Meerut was set up in 1806 with particular key interests including its closeness to Delhi and its area inside the rich Ganges – Yamuna doab. With time Meerut advanced into one of the biggest and most vital military stations of India. The city was made headquarters of the eponymous district in 1818.

Meerut is famously associated with the 1857 rebellion against Company rule in India. The famous slogan "Dilli Chalo" ("Let's march to Delhi!") was first spoken in the city, and the Meerut cantonment was the place where the rebellion started.

The revolt, which catapulted Meerut into international prominence, started in March 1857 at Barrackpore, Bengal. Indian sepoy Mangal Pandey shot at two of his commanding officers, missed, made an unsuccessful attempt to commit suicide and was executed. By April, the fire of Pandey's Uprising scorched north India and reached Meerut, the second-largest East India Company garrison. Here, Europeans and native sepoys were evenly balanced, with a little more than 2,000 on each side. The European cantonment was separated from the Indian one. Close by were Sadar Bazar and Lal Kurti Bazar, the latter named after the red uniforms worn by the Presidency armies. On 24 April 1857, Meerut's commander, Colonel Carmichael Smyth, paraded 90 Indian sepoys of the Bengal Cavalry, most of whom had come from Uttar Pradesh and Bihar. He ordered them to fire the new Enfield cartridges- 85 refused. The cartridges were covered with paper that had to be torn off; Muslim soldiers believed the paper was greased with pig fat and Hindus, with cow fat.

All 85 soldiers were stripped of their uniforms, court-martialed; they were all sentenced to a decade in prison. The prisoners, who were upper-class members of a cavalry regiment, were shocked at the harsh sentences handed down to them. On 10 May 1857, Kotwal Dhan Singh Gurjar opened the gates of the prison. These soldiers, along with the other imprisoned soldiers, escaped prison and declared themselves free, mutinied, attacked and killed several Company officials in the city in order to bring it under their control. This marked the beginning of a widespread revolt across northern India as these soldiers marched towards Delhi. 10 May is still celebrated as a local holiday in Meerut.

Meerut was also the venue of the Meerut Conspiracy Case in March 1929, in which several trade unionists, including three Englishmen, were arrested by the colonial authorities for organising a railway strike action. The case quickly became the subject of attention in England, inspiring a 1932 play titled Meerut Prisoners by left-wing Manchester street theatre group the Red Megaphones, which highlighted the detrimental effects of capitalism and industrialisation. Electricity was first introduced to Meerut in 1931. In the 1940s, during the height of the Indian independence movement, cinema-goers in Meerut had an unofficial policy of refusing to stand up when God Save the Queen played before the film was shown. The last session of the Indian National Congress (INC) prior to the independence of India in 1947 was held at Victoria Park in Meerut on 26 November 1946. It was in this session that the Constitution-making committee was constituted.

Post-independence era
The city and district also suffered from communal (Hindu-Sikh) riots in 1984 and (Hindu-Muslim) riots in 1982 and in 1987, during which the Hashimpura massacre took place, in May 1987, when personnel of the Provincial Armed Constabulary (PAC) shot dead 42 Muslims, the trial of the case is still pending. In 2006, a fire at a consumer electronics "Brand India" fair in Victoria Park Stadium killed at least 100 people, with authorities already confirming 45 fatalities, although a specific figure on a toll was difficult to put and was predicted to be much higher.

Climate

Meerut has a monsoon influenced humid subtropical climate characterised by hot summers and cooler winters. Summers last from early April to late June during and are extremely hot, with temperatures reaching . The monsoon arrives in late June and continues till the middle of September. Temperatures drop slightly, with plenty of cloud cover but with higher humidity. Most of the rainfall is received during the monsoon. Humidity varies from 30 to 100%. The city receives no snow.

Geography

Meerut is the largest city in NCR after Delhi also known as sports city of India. Meerut lies between the plains of the Ganges and those of the Yamuna. In area Meerut district covers 2,522 km2 (974 sq mi), which is larger than Delhi (Delhi covers an area of 1,484 km2 [573 sq mi]). However, Meerut's population is three times less than that of Delhi (Current population of Meerut is 3,443,689).

Administration

General Administration 
Meerut division which consists of six districts, and is headed by the Divisional Commissioner of Meerut, who is an IAS officer of high seniority, the Commissioner is the head of local government institutions (including Municipal Corporations) in the division, is in charge of infrastructural development in his division. The District Magistrate of Meerut reports to the Divisional Commissioner. The current Commissioner is Surendra Singh.

Meerut district administration is headed by the District Magistrate of Meerut, who is an IAS officer. The DM is in charge of property records and revenue collection for the central government and oversees the elections held in the city. The district is subdivided into three tehsils, namely Meerut, Mawana and Sardhana, each headed by a Sub-Divisional Magistrate. The tehsils are further divided into 12 blocks. The current District Magistrate of Meerut is Depak Meena.

Police Administration 
Meerut district comes under Meerut police zone and Meerut police range of Uttar Pradesh Police. Meerut zone is headed by an IPS officer in the rank of Additional Director General of Police (ADG), whereas Meerut range is headed by an IPS officer in the rank of Inspector General of Police (IG). The Current ADG, Meerut Zone is Rajeev Sabharwal, whereas the current IG, Meerut Range is Praveen Kumar.

District Police of Meerut is headed by the Senior Superintendent of Police (SSP) who is an IPS officer. He is assisted by four Superintendents of Police (SP)/Additional Superintendent of Police (Addl. SP) (City, Rural Area, Traffic and Crime). The Meerut district is divided into numerous police circles, each headed by a Circle Officer in the rank of Deputy Superintendent of Police. SP (Traffic) and SP (Crime) are assisted by one Circle Officer in the rank of Deputy Superintendent of Police each. The current SSP is Rohit Singh Sajwan.

Infrastructure and Civic Administration 
The development of infrastructure in the city is overseen by the Meerut Development Authority (MDA), which comes under the Housing Department of Uttar Pradesh government. The Divisional Commissioner of Meerut acts as the ex-officio Chairman of MDA, whereas a vice-chairman, a government-appointed IAS officer, looks after the daily matters of the authority. The current vice-chairman of Meerut Development Authority is Sita Ram Yadav.

The city is administered by Meerut Municipal Corporation, which is responsible for performing civic administrative functions administered by Municipal Commissioner (PCS Officer) whereas Mayor is ceremonial head of the corporation. The current Municipal Commissioner of Meerut Municipal Corporation is Manoj Kumar Chauhan.

Central Government Offices 
The office of the Chief Commissioner, Customs & Central Excise, Meerut Zone, has jurisdiction over 13 districts of Uttrakhand and 14 districts of Uttar Pradesh. This jurisdiction was carved out of the Lucknow Zone. It comprises the erstwhile Customs & Central Excise Commissionerates of Meerut & Noida. The Meerut Commissionerate was bifurcated into two Commissionerates, namely, ‘Meerut-I and Ghaziabad’ and the Noida Commissionerate was bifurcated into ‘Noida and Meerut-II’. In addition, jurisdiction of Central Excise Division Bareilly was included in the jurisdiction of Meerut-II Commissionerate.
CGHS department of Meerut provides comprehensive health care facilities for the central govt employees and pensioners and their dependents residing in this city.

District management

The Janikhurd Block is established on 1 October 1962.
The Rohta block is established on 1 October 1959.
The Daurala block is established on 1 October 1962.
The Rajpura block is established on 1 October 1959.
The Kharkhoda block is established on 1 October 1959.
The Mawana block is established on 1 April 1957.
The Meerut block is established on 1 April 1957.
The Hastinapur block is established on 1 April 1963.
The Sardhana block is established on 26 January 1955.
The Saroorpur khurd block is established on 1 April 1959.
The Machchhara block is established on 1 October 1961.
The Parikshitgarh block is established on 1 April 1958.

Meerut Cantonment

Meerut Cantonment was established by the British East India Company in 1803 after the Battle of Laswari. It is the one of the largest cantonment of India both in land area  and population of 93684 (civil + military) people as per 2011 census. The Revolt of 1857 started from "Kali Paltan" in Meerut Cantonment and Indian soldiers stationed here actively participated in the rebellion. The cantonment surrounds the old city from 3 sides – from Pallavpuram to Sainik Vihar to Ganga Nagar. It is well connected with the rest of country by roads as well as by rail. The Delhi Niti Paas Road (State Highway No. 45) passes through Meerut Cantonment. Meerut cantonment was the divisional headquarters of the 7th (Meerut) Division of the British Indian Army from 1829 to 1920.

Soldiers from the cantonment have actively participated in the First Battle of Ypres, both the 1st and 2nd Battles of El Alamein, Battle of France, Burma Campaign, the Indo-Pakistani Wars, Bangladesh Liberation War and Kargil War.

It has been the regimental center of Punjab Regiment Corps of Signals, Jat Regiment, Sikh Regiment and Dogra Regiment.

Development

Meerut is the 63rd-fastest-growing urban area in the world. It is the 14th fastest developing city in India. A June 2011 report by US financial services firm Morgan Stanley gave Meerut the 5th spot on the "vibrancy" index, ahead of Delhi and Mumbai. Meerut ranked second on both the financial penetration index, which measures things like the presence of ATMs and bank branches, and on the consumption index, indicating the city's transformation into an urban town. While the city ranked in the bottom 10 in job creations, the report suggests that overall there are plenty of signs of "potential for urbanisation," including future employment opportunities. The infrastructure segment of Meerut is currently going through a boom phase with many new projects coming up in and around the city. There are many new buildings, shopping complexes, malls, roads, flyovers and apartments coming up. The Upper Ganga Canal Expressway is also under development. On the India City Competitiveness Index, the city ranked 45th in 2010, 37th in 2011 and 39th in 2012.

Economy

Industry

Meerut is one of the important industrial towns of western Uttar Pradesh with several traditional and modern industries. It is traditionally known for handloom works and scissors industry. Meerut was one of the first cities in northern India where publishing was set up during the 19th century. It was a major center of commercial publishing during the 1860s and 1870s.

Meerut is a rich agricultural area, which also contains land that is not suitable for harvest.. Being in the proximity of Delhi, it is ideal for industry. It is home to 520 micro, small and medium scale industries. , Meerut has about 23,471 industrial units, including 15,510 small-scale units and 7,922 cottage industries.

Existing industries in the city include tyres, textile, transformer, sugar, distillery, chemical, engineering, paper, publishing, and sports goods manufacture. Prospective industries include IT and ITES.

Uttar Pradesh State Industrial Development Corporation (UPSIDC) has two industrial estates in the city, namely Partapur and Udyog Puram.

Revenue generation
Meerut has shown healthy numbers in terms of revenue generation. In 2005–06, Meerut occupied the fifth slot and contributed Rs 10,306 crore to the direct tax collection. It slipped to number six in 2006–07 when the revenue collection at Rs 11,203 crore was 18% lower than the target of Rs 13,627 crore. According to statistics compiled by the Income Tax department, Meerut contributed a Rs.10,089 crore to the national treasury in 2007/08, overall it was ranked 9th outperforming Lucknow, Jaipur, Bhopal, Kochi and Bhubaneshwar.

Transport

Road

Meerut is well-connected by road to major cities like Delhi, Noida, Faridabad, Ghaziabad, Haridwar, Bulandshahr, etc. A large number of people commute to Delhi, Noida, Greater Noida, Ghaziabad and Gurugram every day for work. Three national highways (NH-58, NH-119 & NH-235) pass through Meerut. The Delhi–Meerut Expressway - a 90 km long controlled-access expressway connects Meerut with Delhi via Dasna in Ghaziabad district. Prime Minister Narendra Modi laid the foundation stone for the expressway on 31 December 2015, and the expressway was completed and opened for public on 1 April 2021.

There are 2 main bus terminals, namely Bhainsali bus terminal and Sohrab Gate bus terminal from where Uttar Pradesh State Road Transport Corporation (UPSRTC) buses ply to cities all over the state and all nearby cities. A JNNURM scheme was put in place. Low Floor City Buses (under JNNURM), Normal City Buses, auto rickshaws and rickshaws are convenient public transport options to commute within the city.

Many new transport infrastructure projects like the inner ring road, outer ring road and construction of new flyovers are proposed and being made as well. The under-construction Ganga Expressway will start from Meerut till Allahabad, and in the future, it will be extended from Meerut to Haridwar. Other expressways which will pass nearby Meerut are the Upper Ganga Canal Expressway, Delhi–Saharanpur–Dehradun Expressway and Gorakhpur–Shamli Expressway.

Railways
Meerut lies on the Delhi–Meerut–Saharanpur line, and has five railway stations: Meerut City, Meerut Cantt., Partapur, Mohiuddinpur and Pabli Khas. Meerut City railway station is the busiest. The railway line between Delhi and Meerut was constructed in 1864, and the Meerut Cantt. station, which serves as a secondary railway station, was founded in 1865.

About 20,000 passengers travel daily to Delhi and back. Around 27 pairs of trains run between Meerut and Delhi, and four between Meerut and Khurja. Two trains are available for Lucknow daily, namely Nauchandi Express and Rajya Rani Express. A weekly train goes to Chennai and Kochuveli. Daily trains connect Meerut to Mumbai, Ahmedabad, Jaipur, Rajkot and many cities in other states.

Metro project

On 30 December 2014, the Uttar Pradesh Cabinet approved the proposed metro rail project in Meerut, to boost the urban mass transport infrastructure in the city. The state government nominated RITES Limited and Uttar Pradesh Metro Rail Corporation (UPMRC) for preparing the respective detailed project report (DPR) and as a coordinator, respectively. The development authorities are nodal agencies for the DPR.

The metro project got approval from the divisional commissioner. It was decided in the meeting that the project would be along two corridors, by dividing the project into two phases–Phase I from Partapur to Pallavpuram, and Phase II from Rajban Market to Gokalpur village. The main stations on the first corridor in the first phase will be Partapur, Panchwati Enclave, Rithani, Rithani West, Shatabdi Nagar, Devlok, Madhavpuram, Meerut Railway Station Road, Lajpat Bazaar, Begampul, Gandhi Bagh, Lekha Nagar, Pallavpuram Dorli, Ansal City and Pallavpuram.
While in the second phase, the corridor in the Partapur-Pallavpuram route will cover 20 km, and will have a total number of 18 stations in between, the 10 km-long route from Rajban Market to Gokalpur village will have nine stations.

Regional Rapid Transit System (RRTS)

The NCR Transport Plan 2021 proposed a rail-based mass transit system, called the Regional Rapid Transit System (RRTS) between Delhi to Meerut, with the Shahdara-Ghaziabad section scheduled for construction during 2001-11, and the Ghaziabad-Meerut section scheduled for 2011–21.

In September 2010, the RRTS was reported to be proposed between Anand Vihar and Meerut with the project in its initial stages. In November 2010, the train speed was proposed to be between 130 and 160 kmph, with stations at Anand Vihar, Sahibabad, Mohan Nagar, Ghaziabad, Guldhar, Duhai, Moradnagar, Modinagar, Meerut South, Shatabdi Nagar, Meerut Centre, Begumpul, Meerut North, Pallavpuram being the stops.

On 14 December 2010, the NCR Planning Board, Meerut Development Authority (MDA) and Meerut Municipal Corporation approved the project. In August 2011, it was reported that the project tender had been awarded to Delhi Integrated Multi-Modal Transit System (DIMTS). The proposed system was to have dedicated trains between Anand Vihar and Meerut, with no stops in between, and trains which will stop at stations will be constructed after a gap of 4–5 km. The reported stations were Anand Vihar, Vaishali, Mohan Nagar, Meerut Road (Airtel Cut), Morta, Duhai, Muradnagar, Gang Nahar, Modinagar, Mohiuddinpur, Meerut Bypass Cut and Pallavpuram, with completion expected in 2017. The track between Anand Vihar to Dabur was proposed to be underground with the rest of the track overhead.

The corporation will take up the construction of the 90 km-long Delhi-Ghaziabad-Meerut corridor on a priority basis (along with two other corridors) with planned completion in 2016. It was reported that the Detailed Project Reports (DPRs) for the three corridors were under the process of finalisation.

In December 2013, problems were reported in the proposed alignment of the Delhi-Meerut corridor. In January 2014, it was reported that the proposed alignment had to be changed due to objections by NHAI and the feasibility report had to be prepared again. The new proposed alignment increased the length from 90 km to 106 km.

In March 2018, the project's construction was started after the foundation stone was laid by Prime Minister, Narendra Modi. The entire corridor will be completed by March 2025.

Air

The Dr. Bhim Rao Ambedkar Airport is located at Partapur. It was proposed by the state government that the airstrip be converted to an international airport to reduce pressure on Delhi airport. However, Plans to expand the Domestic airport were called off after protests against land acquisition started in other parts of the state. Following an accident in May 2012, the city administration barred private flights from using the airstrip.

Demographics

According to the 2011 census, the Meerut Urban Agglomeration (Meerut UA) has a population of around 1.42 million, (comparable to kingdom of Bahrain or Trinidad and Tobago) with the municipality contributing roughly 1.31 million of it. The Meerut Urban Agglomeration consists of area falling under Meerut Municipal Corporation, Meerut Cantonment Board and 4 census towns of Sindhawali, Amehra Adipur, Aminagar Urf Bhurbaral and Mohiuddinpur. This makes Meerut the 33rd most populous urban agglomeration and the 28th most populous city in India. The sex ratio in Meerut UA is 887, lower than the state average of 908; while the child sex ratio is 845, lower than the state average of 899. 12.99% of the population is under 6 years of age. The overall literacy rate is 76.28%, higher than the state average of 69.72%.

, Meerut ranks 328 (based on population), 189 (based on population density), 648 (based on built-up area) among world's urban areas.

According to the 2001 census, the city ranked 2nd in terms of population in NCR and 25th in India.

Culture

Most traditional Indian festivals, including Holi, Dussehra, Diwali, Eid among others are celebrated with fervor in the city. Notably, a fair by the name of Nauchandi Fair is held two weeks after Holi every year. The fair, which started in 1672, continues for about 15 days and is attended by lakhs of people. It includes events such as poetry recitations in Hindi, Urdu, Punjabi etc. Khariboli is the local dialect with official business conducted in either Hindi-Urdu or English. 

Meerut is the headquarters of the Roman Catholic Meerut Diocese, which covers the districts of Meerut, Muzaffarnagar, Saharanpur, Dehradun, Haridwar, Moradabad, Rampur, Jyotiba Phule Nagar, Ghaziabad, Baghpat and Dhampur Tehsil of Bijnor district.

Nauchandi Mela (Fair) 

The Nauchandi Mela is an annual fair held at Nauchandi Ground in Meerut. The fair stretches for about a month and is organized by the Municipal Corporation of Meerut. It generally starts from the second Sunday after Holi. The main exhibits are the artistic and religious rituals followed in rustic Uttar Pradesh. The fair witness more than 50,000 visitors every year. The Indian Railways' Nauchandi Express train is named after this fair.

The fair has a prominent history dating back several hundreds of years. It started in the year 1672 AD as a one-day cattle trading fair. The fair has been held every year, excluding 1858, the year after 1857 revolt, which started from Meerut.

Since then cattle trading has been replaced by a number of other activities. The fair feature shops for Lucknow's Chikan work, Moradabad's brassware, Varanasi's carpets, rugs and silk sarees, Agra's footwear, Meerut's leather items, etc. Meerut's own products like sports goods, scissors, gajaks, nan-khatai are also sold. Giant rides, wheels, circus and various other recreational arenas where artists perform stunts, remains a big attraction of the fair.

Film and television 
Meerut is home to a film industry, which has a following in Western Uttar Pradesh and Haryana. The films are usually folklore stories or comedies or localised versions of Bollywood hits. The films which have been shot here include Sonu Ke Titu Ki Sweety, Zero, and Rajma Chawal.

Notable people from Meerut in the film and television industry include Bharat Bhushan, Aziz Mian, Mandakini, Achint Kaur, Kailash Kher, Chitrangada Singh, Vishal Bhardwaj, Deepti Bhatnagar and Pravesh Rana.

Education

Meerut is an education hub of Western Uttar Pradesh with near about four or five universities, approximately 50 engineering colleges, 23 management colleges, seven pharmacy colleges, four colleges offering hotel management, one college offering fashion design, over 150 academic colleges and over 50 schools. The city is home to Chaudhary Charan Singh University (formerly Meerut University), Sardar Vallabhbhai Patel University of Agriculture and Technology, Swami Vivekanand Subharti University, Shobhit Institute of Engineering & Technology and IIMT University. The city has one government-run engineering college, Sir Chhotu Ram Institute of Engineering and Technology, a constituent college of Chaudhary Charan Singh University. There are schools affiliated to recognized boards such as ICSE, CBSE, IB and the state board. One such school is the St. John's Sr. Sec School (established by Begum Samru) which is over 130 years old, also the first IB school in Uttar Pradesh was Vidya Global school.

Shobhit Institute of Engineering & Technology is the only Deemed-to-be University in Meerut district. It was notified in 2006 by Ministry of HRD, Government of India u/s 3 of UGC Act 1956.

Shri Venkateshwara University recognized by UGC, located in Amroha near Meerut.

IIMT Engineering College which is now called IIMT University is the oldest engineering institute of Meerut district. It was established in 1997.

Chaudhary Charan Singh University (CCSU) is a public and state university which has many degree colleges affiliated to it. They fall in two divisions: Saharanpur and Meerut with nine districts including Saharanpur, Meerut, Muzaffarnagar, Shamli, Gautam Budh Nagar, Bagpat, Hapur, Bulandshahr and Ghaziabad administered by Vice-Chancellor and Registrar (PCS officer).
The Indian Film and Television Institute is located at the western bypass of the city. The city has three medical colleges: Lala Lajpat Rai Memorial Medical College, Subharti Medical College and Mulayam Singh Yadav Medical College & Hospital.

Notable Schools
Dewan Public School, Meerut
St. Mary's Academy, Meerut
St. Thomas' English Medium School

Media
Meerut is becoming a media centre, as journalists from all over Uttar Pradesh and other Indian states are working in Meerut. Radio stations shared with Delhi are Radio City 91.1 MHz, Big FM 92.7 MHz, Red FM 93.5 MHz, Radio One 94.3 MHz, Hit 95 (95 MHz), Radio Mirchi 98.3 MHz, AIR FM Rainbow 102.6 MHz, Meow FM 104.8 MHz, AIR FM Gold 106.4 MHz. Radio IIMT (90.4 MHz) is the only radio station located in the city. The Hindi-language daily newspapers Hindustan (newspaper), Rajasthan Patrika, Dainik Jagran, Amar Ujala, Dainik Janwani, The Hindu, Rashtrasewa, Dainik Jagran iNext are published from the city. The English daily Times of India, Meerut edition and the English language supplement HT City, Meerut with Hindustan Times is also published there. Moneymakers, an English daily is also published there. Asian Express, Hindi newspaper and news magazine Citizen of the World are also published there.

Sports Industries 
Meerut is one of the prominent Center in the country besides Jalandhar for the manufacture of sports goods. There are numerous sports companies in the city especially for cricket namely SS, SF, SG, RM Sports,  BDM, GEM etc. Players like MS Dhoni, Virender Sehwag, Yuvraj Singh, Kieron Pollard, Virat Kohli, Kumar Sangakkara and many others have used bats made in Meerut. 40,000-capacity Kailash Prakash Stadium is located in Meerut.

Tourist destinations

 
Tourist destinations in and around Meerut include:
 Digamber Jain Bada Mandir Hastinapur – Located on the banks of the old ravine of Ganges, Hastinapur NCR is considered one of the holiest places on earth by Jains. It is believed to be the birthplace of three Jain Tirthankaras. There are many ancient Jain temples in Hastinapur NCR. Shri Digamber Jain Mandir, Jambudweep, Kailash Parvat Rachna, Shwetambar Jain Temple are the main and famous temples in Hastinapur NCR. Apart from Jain temples, Pandeshwar temple, Historical Gurdwara and Hastinapur Sanctuary are worth being seen.
 Government Freedom Struggle Museum and Shaheed Smarak - Government Freedom Struggle Museum, Meerut was established in 1997. It is located in the Shaheed Smarak compound on Delhi Road, about 6 km north-east from the city railway station and at a distance of about 200 meters from the Delhi Bus Station. Visitors can stay in various guesthouses, private lodges and hotels.The Museum’s main aim is the collection, preservation, documentation and exhibition of cultural property and to make it available for educational activities as well as for creation of awareness about our glorious past.Some postal stamps, pictures, post cards, memorial coins related to the events of 1857 and latter coins are also in the collection of the museum. The museum is in the developing stages and efforts are being made to collect more specimens. The museum organises educational programs such as lectures, seminars and competitions related to history, culture, philosophy, the freedom struggle and religion.It also aims at coordinating with other cultural and educational organizations for disseminating Indian culture and particularly the events related to the long drawn freedom struggle of India. Museum Timings : 10:30 AM. to 4:30 PM. Open on all days except Monday, Sunday following 2nd Saturday of the month and public holidays.
 Shahi Jama Masjid – The Jama Masjid was built by Hasan Mahdi, Sultan Mahmud Ghaznavi's Wazir (=Chief Minister) in 1019 AD (older than the Qutb Minar). It is considered the first Masjid in North India. Although it was restored by Humayun, it is one of the oldest mosques in India. Some believe that the first North Indian Mosque is Quwwat/Qubbat ul Islam in Delhi and then Adhai Din Ka Jhonpra in Ajmer.
 St. John's Church – This church was established by Chaplain the Reverend Henry Fisher on behalf of the East India Company in 1819 in the cantonment area and was completed in 1822. It is considered one of the oldest churches in North India. The Church was dedicated to the people by Bishop Wilson. It has a seating capacity of 10,000 people. During the war of 1857, this church was the scene of heavy fighting between Indians and the British forces.
 Augarnath Temple – This temple (also known as Kalipaltan Mandir locally) is located at the site where the soldiers of the war of 1857 planned their operations. The temple also houses a memorial built to honour the martyrs of the Indian Rebellion of 1857. The old temple has been replaced by a modern version.
 Mansabiya Karbala – Mansabiya's Mosque and Karbala was built by Nawab Mansab Ali Khan in 1882.
Functions are organised at the memorial around the national holidays of India. The memorial complex also houses the Government Freedom Struggle Museum which is dedicated to the first war of Indian independence.

 Shahpeer's Mausoleum (Shahpeer ki Dargah) – This is a Mughal mausoleum erected by the empress Nur Jahan in 1628 in honour of a local Muslim Hazrat Shahpeer. It is a red stone structure that was partly built and is incomplete till date. The tomb is adorned by intricate Nakkashi (stone painting). There is no roof on the main tomb. It is said that Shahpeer was the teacher of Mughal Emperor Jehangir. The tomb is listed by the Archaeological Survey of India as a national heritage monument.
 Parikshitgarh Fort – The place is associated with and derives its name from King Parikshit of Hastinapur NCR (the grandson of Arjuna). The fort was built by Parikshit and restored by Gurjar Raja Nain Singh in the eighteenth century.
 Dargah of Baley Miyan (Bale Miyan ki Dargah) – This dargah was built by Qutb-ud-din Aybak in 1194 in the memory of Ghazi Saiyyad Salar Masud (known locally as Baley Miyan). An urs is organised annually at the Dargah during the Nauchandi fair. It is adjacent to the Chandi Devi Mandir, which signifies the Hindu-Muslim unity.

Other places of interest include Mansa Devi Temple, Baleni, Basilica of Our Lady of Graces, Sardhana and the Chandi Devi Temple which was built by Holkar queen Devi Ahiliyabai Holkar.

Notable people

Indian Rebellion of 1857

Dhan Singh Gurjar
Kadam Singh, leader of a group of Gurjars who fought against the British East India Company during the Indian Rebellion of 1857

Films and music 

Deepti Bhatnagar
Bharat Bhushan
Ayananka Bose
Arun Govil
Achint Kaur
Kailash Kher
Mitakshara Kumar
Popular Meeruthi
Chitrangada Singh
Sanjeev Tyagi

Kings and monarchs

*Nain Singh Nagar, king of Meerut district in the 18th century

Maharaja Surajmal, meerut was under his kingdom during 17th century.

Politics

 Rajendra Agrawal, Member of Parliament, for Meerut
Mohammed Shahid Akhlaq
 Dr. Laxmikant Bajpai, Former State President, BJP, Uttar Pradesh.
Ravindra Kumar Bhadana, politician
Hemlata Chaudhary, politician
Lakhi Ram Nagar, businessman and politician
Malook Nagar, businessman and politician
Rubab Sayda
Yashwant Singh
Somendra Tomar, Member of the Legislative Assembly for Meerut South
Vijaypal Singh Tomar
Seema Upadhyay

Sports

Vivek Agarwal, cricketer
Mohd Asab, shooter
Manu Attri, badminton player
Shapath Bharadwaj, shooter
Garima Chaudhary, judoka
Saurabh Chaudhary, shooter
Dharampal Singh Gudha, oldest Gurjar athlete
Praveen Gupta, cricketer
Romeo James, field hockey player
Paramjeet Kaur, athlete
Muzzaffaruddin Khalid, cricketer
Ashok Kumar, field hockey player
Bhuvneshwar Kumar, cricketer
Praveen Kumar, cricketer
Raman Lamba, cricketer
Shivam Mavi, cricketer
Arvind Panwar, cyclist
Annu Rani, athlete
Sameer Rizvi, cricketer
Shahzar Rizvi, shooter
Karn Sharma, cricketer
Umang Sharma, cricketer
Mohinder Pal Singh, field hockey player
Parvinder Singh, cricketer
Shardul Vihan, sport shooter

Scholars

Sir Ziauddin Ahmed, academic and parliamentarian
Satish Chandra, Indian historian
Anu Garg, educationist and author
K. P. S. Mahalwar, legal educationist and administrator
Zayn al-Abidin Sajjad Meerthi, Indian Islamic scholar and historian
Sheikh Abdul Aleem Siddiqui Qadri Meerathi, Islamic scholar and writer
Manu Prakash, scientist and MacArthur Fellowship awardee

See also
 2006 Meerut fire
 Meerut (Lok Sabha constituency)
 Hapur (Assembly constituency)
 Kithore (Assembly constituency)
 Meerut (Assembly constituency)
 Meerut Cantonment (Assembly constituency)
 Meerut South (Assembly constituency)

References

Sources

Further reading
 Service and Adventure with the Khakee Ressalah; Or, Meerut Volunteer Horse, During the Mutinies of 1857–58, by Robert Henry Wallace Dunlop, Pub. R. Bentley, 1858.
 The Chaplain's Narrative of the Siege of Delhi: From the Outbreak at Meerut to the Capture of Delhi, by John Edward Wharton Rotton. Pub. Smith, Elder, 1858.
 
 The Mutiny outbreak at Meerut in 1857, by Julian Arthur Beaufort Palmer. Cambridge University Press, 1966. .
 Mutiny in Meerut, by Vivian Stuart. Aidan Ellis Publishing, 1991. .
 Flashman in the Great Game, by George MacDonald Fraser, 1975.

External links

 Old Village Mahadeo
 
 Government Freedom Struggle Museum, Meerut
 Meerut City Portal

 
Metropolitan cities in India
Articles containing potentially dated statements from 2001
All articles containing potentially dated statements
Articles containing potentially dated statements from 2009
Cities and towns in Meerut district
Cities in Uttar Pradesh